Judson Sykes Bury  (1852–1944) was a British physician, surgeon, and neurologist.

Biography
After education at Amersham Hall and then two years at Owens College, Manchester, Judson Bury entered University College London and studied medicine at University College Hospital, London. In 1877 he qualified MRCS and graduated MB (Lond.). After holding house appointments at University College Hospital, he graduated MD (Lond.) in 1879. He returned to Manchester and, after one year as a senior resident medical officer at the Manchester Children's Hospital, Pendlebury, engaged in general practice. At the Manchester Royal Infirmary he became in 1885 a registrar, in 1889 an assistant physician, and in 1899 a full physician. In 1911 he became a professor of clinical at the University of Manchester. He retired from his Manchester appointments in 1912 but during WWI became a major in the RAMC and served on medical boards in Manchester and Warrington.

In 1893 Bury published A Treatise on Peripheral Neuritis, in large part consisting of observations by James Ross (1837–1892). Ross had intended to publish the observations in a monograph.

Bury was elected FRCP in 1894.

Bury's article Multiple Symmetrical Peripheral Neuritis, contributed to the first edition of Clifford Allbutt's A System of Medicine, contained a section on an epidemic of neuritis in Manchester caused by arsenical impurity in beer. He gave the Bradshaw Lecture in 1901. He published Diseases of the Nervous System in 1912.

Selected publications

Articles
with Sydney Ringer: 

with J. F. Ward: 

 (Correction in: Br Med J. 1943 Apr 10; 1(4292): 466)

Books
with James Ross:

References

External links

1852 births
1944 deaths
British neurologists
19th-century British medical doctors
20th-century British medical doctors
People educated at Amersham Hall
Alumni of the UCL Medical School
Fellows of the Royal College of Physicians
Physicians of the Manchester Royal Infirmary
Royal Army Medical Corps officers